Donava (formerly Donuva) is a village in Kėdainiai district municipality, in Kaunas County, in central Lithuania. According to the 2011 census, the village had a population of 24 people. It is located on the southeastern limit of Pajieslys village (Toplių street) and de facto is a part of Pajieslys village.

Demography

References

Villages in Kaunas County
Kėdainiai District Municipality